John H. Pitman High School, colloquially Pitman High School (PHS), is a comprehensive high school located in Turlock, in the heart of the northern San Joaquin Valley in the U.S. state of California. It is situated in a transitional agrarian/suburban community and serves most of the northern part of Turlock, as well as the nearby CDP of Keyes.

History 
In the 1990s, Turlock High School became the second largest high school in Northern California causing overcrowding. In 1998, residents of Turlock passed a community bond to construct a new high school which was completed and opened in August 2002. The school was named for John H. Pitman, the twenty year principal of Turlock High School. The first day saw 1,000 students. Superintendent William H. Gibson noted that Pitman "was constructed under budget and well in advance of the scheduled opening of school."

Notable alumni 
 Bradin Hagens - MLB baseball player.
 [[Colin Kaepernick]], NFL quarterback and [[civil rights activist]] (Class of 2006)

References 

Turlock, California
High schools in Stanislaus County, California
Educational institutions established in 2002
Public high schools in California
2002 establishments in California